The Moluccan cuckooshrike (Coracina atriceps) is a species of bird in the family Campephagidae.
It is endemic to Indonesia.

Its natural habitat is subtropical or tropical moist lowland forest.

References

Moluccan cuckooshrike
Birds of the Maluku Islands
Moluccan cuckooshrike
Taxonomy articles created by Polbot